Alexis Alexanian is an American independent film producer. She was the President of New York Women in Film & Television, 2012–2017.

Footnotes

External links

Locomotive Taps Producer Alexis Alexanian as President Production

1962 births
Independent Spirit Award winners
Living people
American film producers
American people of Armenian descent